Thomas Wayne Gibis (born August 22, 1964) is an American film, television, voice actor, and Emmy-nominated writer/producer.  Gibis is best known as the voice of Shikamaru Nara from Naruto, Takumi Nomiya from Honey and Clover, and Mushra from Shinzo.

Early life 
Gibis was born in West St. Paul, Minnesota.

Filmography

Anime
 Busou Renkin – Jinnai, Jirou Chouno
 Boruto: Naruto Next Generations – Shikamaru Nara
 Digimon Adventure 02 – Michael (Adventure 02)
 Honey and Clover – Takumi Nomiya
 Kabaneri of the Iron Fortress – Sukari
 Marmalade Boy – Tsutomu Rokutanda
 Naruto – Shikamaru Nara, Additional Voices
 Naruto: Shippuden – Shikamaru Nara
 Shinzo – Mushra
 The Prince of Tennis – Yuta Fuji

Films
 JLA Adventures: Trapped in Time – Toyman, Pa Kent
 Naruto the Movie 2: Legend of the Stone of Gelel – Shikamaru Nara
 Naruto Shippuden 3: Inheritors of the Will of Fire – Shikamaru Nara
 The Last: Naruto the Movie – Shikamaru Nara

Live–action
 Beautiful Girls – Peter the Eater
 The Lobo Paramilitary Christmas Special – the Easter Bunny

Television
 Grounded for Life – Chuck
 A.U.S.A. – Corbie

Video games
 Naruto: Rise of a Ninja – Shikamaru Nara
 Naruto: The Broken Bond - Shikamaru Nara
 Naruto Shippuden: Ultimate Ninja Storm 2 – Shikamaru Nara
 Naruto Shippuden: Ultimate Ninja Storm Generations – Shikamaru Nara
 Naruto Shippuden: Ultimate Ninja Storm 3 – Shikamaru Nara
 Naruto Shippuden: Ultimate Ninja Storm Revolution – Shikamaru Nara
 Naruto Shippuden: Ultimate Ninja Storm 4 – Shikamaru Nara
 Naruto: Uzumaki Chronicles – Shikamaru Nara
 Naruto: Ultimate Ninja – Shikamaru Nara
 Naruto: Ultimate Ninja Storm – Shikamaru Nara

References

External links

1964 births
Living people
American male voice actors
Male actors from Saint Paul, Minnesota
People from West St. Paul, Minnesota